Sir Edmund Hampden (born ) was an English landowner, at the centre of a celebrated state legal case in the reign of Charles I of England, known as the Five Knights' Case or Darnell's Case.

In 1626 Hampden, along with Sir Thomas Darnell, Sir John Corbet, Sir Walter Erle, and Sir John Heveningham, were among 70 individuals, including his nephew, the politician John Hampden, who were imprisoned without trial for refusing to pay "forced loans", demanded by Charles I to fund the current war against Spain. 

Hampden and the other knights submitted a joint petition for habeas corpus to the Court of King's Bench, which agreed and ordered them to be brought before the court to clarify what law they had broken. Hampden's counsel in the case was the noted legal scholar John Selden.

The judges were unable to determine what law had been broken, and avoided the issue by denying bail on the grounds that as there were no charges, "the [prisoners] could not be freed, as the offence was probably too dangerous for public discussion". Despite the judges' refusal to release the prisoners, Charles decided not to pursue charges.

Family 

Hampden was one of two or three sons to Griffith Hampden (1543–91) and Anne Cave (d. 1594). His brother William (1570-1597) married Elizabeth Cromwell (1574-1664), the sister of Oliver Cromwell; their children included the politician John Hampden.

Hampden's daughter Elizabeth married Colonel Nathaniel Rich of the Rich family, and their children included Sir Robert Rich.

References

Citations 
 
 
 
 

English knights
17th-century English landowners
Date of birth unknown
Place of birth unknown
Date of death unknown
Place of death unknown
Year of birth uncertain